The Minnesota Air National Guard (MN ANG) is the aerial militia of the U.S. state of Minnesota. It is, along with the Minnesota Army National Guard, an element of the Minnesota National Guard.

As state militia units, the units in the Minnesota Air National Guard are not in the normal United States Air Force chain of command. They are under the jurisdiction of the Governor of Minnesota though the office of the Minnesota Adjutant General unless they are federalized by order of the President of the United States. The Minnesota Air National Guard is headquartered in St. Paul, and its commander is  Major General Jon Jensen.

Overview
Under the "Total Force" concept, Minnesota Air National Guard units are considered to be Air Reserve Components (ARC) of the United States Air Force (USAF).  Minnesota ANG units are trained and equipped by the Air Force and are operationally gained by a Major Command of the USAF if federalized. In addition, the Minnesota Air National Guard forces are assigned to Air Expeditionary Forces and are subject to deployment tasking orders along with their active duty and Air Force Reserve counterparts in their assigned cycle deployment window.

Along with their federal reserve obligations, as state militia units the elements of the Minnesota ANG are subject to being activated by order of the Governor to provide protection of life and property, and preserve peace, order and public safety. State missions include disaster relief in times of earthquakes, hurricanes, floods and forest fires, search and rescue, protection of vital public services, and support to civil defense.

Components
The Minnesota Air National Guard consists of the following major units:
 133rd Airlift Wing
 Established  17 January 1921 (as: 109th Observation Squadron); operates: C-130H3 Hercules
 Stationed at: Minneapolis–Saint Paul Joint Air Reserve Station
 Gained by: Air Mobility Command
 The 133d Airlift Wing is an air transport organization flying C-130H Hercules tactical airlifters. Its normal flying operations include air-drop training and transport missions.

 148th Fighter Wing
 Established 17 September 1948 (as: 179th Fighter Squadron); operates: F-16 Fighting Falcon
 Stationed at: Duluth Air National Guard Base
 Gained by: Air Combat Command
 The 148th Fighter Wing provides air defense of the northern great lakes and over the state of Minnesota.

History
The Militia Act of 1903 established the present National Guard system, units raised by the states but paid for by the Federal Government, liable for immediate state service. If federalized by Presidential order, they fall under the regular military chain of command.

On 1 June 1920, the Militia Bureau issued Circular No.1 on organization of National Guard air units. Following that announcement, the Assistant Adjutant General for Minnesota, Lt Col William Garis, met with T. Glenn Harrison, a reporter, and Ray S. Miller, a First World War pilot, to discuss plans for a Minnesota National Guard aviation unit. With the backing of the Minnesota Adjutant General, Brig. Gen. Walter Rhinow, Harrison and Miller formed, on paper, the 109th Squadron, a unit without Federal status. In addition to Rhinow, the initiative had high-level backing in the form of Minnesota Governor Joseph Burnquist.

On 26 September 1920, encouraged by Governor Burnquist, Brig. Gen. Rhinow, Lt. Col. Garis, and now Captain Ray Miller set out in a rented Curtiss Oriole from St. Paul to Washington DC to lobby the Militia Bureau and the Army Air Service to create an aviation arm for the National Guard. The unprecedented journey took eight days, the trio landing on October 2. In meetings with various military officials, including Brig. Gen Billy Mitchell, then assistant chief of the Air Service, the trio evoked interest and garnered support for Minnesota National Guard aviation. Seemingly as a result, on 17 January 1921 the 109th Squadron was federally recognized, the first National Guard flying unit to achieve such status post-war. The unit was redesignated the 109th Observation Squadron on 25 January 1923.

The 116th Observation Squadron was ordered into active service on 10 February 1941 as part of the buildup of the Army Air Corps prior to the United States entry into World War II.  The squadron was sent to Europe, initially flying the Supermarine Spitfire Mk.V, and later reconnaissance missions with the North American F-6 Mustang. During the Korean War Minnesota's Air Guard was also activated, contributing pilots to active wings in Korea.

On 24 May 1946, the United States Army Air Forces, in response to dramatic postwar military budget cuts imposed by President Harry S. Truman, allocated inactive unit designations to the National Guard Bureau for the formation of an Air Force National Guard. These unit designations were allotted and transferred to various State National Guard bureaus to provide them unit designations to re-establish them as Air National Guard units.

The modern Minnesota ANG received federal recognition on 28 August 1947 as the 109th Fighter Squadron at Wold-Chamberlain Field, Minneapolis. It was equipped with F-51D Mustangs and its mission was the air defense of the state. 18 September 1947, however, is considered the Minnesota Air National Guard's official birth concurrent with the establishment of the United States Air Force as a separate branch of the United States military under the National Security Act.

In the 1950s and early 1960 both units of the 179th Fighter Interceptor Squadron in Duluth and 109th Fighter Interceptor Squadron in St. Paul were providing active air defense commitments with 24-hour alert status. Threats by the Soviet Union to oust Western troops from West Berlin in 1961 prompted the Berlin Crisis and a call-up of selected National Guard forces throughout the U.S. 

Included in this mobilization were members and Boeing C-97G Stratofreighters of the 133rd Air Transport Wing, who served in federal active service for 11 months while operating out of their home station at the Minneapolis–Saint Paul International Airport.

During the Vietnam War, although never officially mobilized, the Air Guard flew hundreds of supply and transport missions to Southeast Asia.

The Minnesota Air National Guard was also activated in the Global War On Terror since 11 September 2001. Immediately after the attack on New York City and Washington, D.C., F-16s from the 148th Fighter Wing were providing combat air patrols over key locations. The 133rd Airlift wing also provided airlift in Afghanistan.

See also

 Minnesota Naval Militia
 Minnesota State Guard
 Minnesota Wing Civil Air Patrol

References

 Gross, Charles J (1996), The Air National Guard and the American Military Tradition, United States Dept. of Defense, 
 Minnesota Air National Guard website

External links

 Minnesota Air National Guard Units
 Minnesota Air National Guard Museum
 133rd Airlift Wing (official website)
 148th Fighter Wing (official website)

United States Air National Guard
Minnesota National Guard